Bolitophagini is a tribe of darkling beetles in the family Tenebrionidae. There are more than 20 genera in Bolitophagini.

Genera
These genera belong to the tribe Bolitophagini:

 Afrobyrsax Ardoin, 1973  (tropical Africa)
 Atasthalomorpha Miyatake, 1964  (the Palearctic)
 Atasthalus Pascoe, 1871  (Indomalaya)
 Boletoxenus Motschulsky, 1858  (the Palearctic and Indomalaya)
 Bolitolaemus Gebien, 1921  (tropical Africa)
 Bolitonaeus Lewis, 1894  (the Palearctic and Indomalaya)
 Bolitophagiella Miyatake, 1964  (the Palearctic)
 Bolitophagus Illiger, 1798  (North America and the Palearctic)
 Bolitotherus Candèze, 1861  (North America)
 Bolitotrogus Miyatake, 1964  (the Palearctic and Indomalaya)
 Byrsax Pascoe, 1860  (the Palearctic, Indomalaya, and Australasia)
 Eleates Casey, 1886  (North America)
 Eledona Latreille, 1797  (the Palearctic)
 Eledonoprius Reitter, 1911  (the Palearctic)
 Lanhsia Shibata, 1980  (Indomalaya)
 Megeleates Casey, 1895  (North America)
 Microatasthalus Ando, 2010  (Indomalaya)
 Microbolitonaeus Grimm, 2014  (Indomalaya)
 Parabolitophagus Miyatake, 1964  (the Palearctic)
 Rhipidandrus LeConte, 1862  (worldwide)
 Sumbawia Gebien, 1925  (Indomalaya)
 † Proteleates Wickham, 1914

References

Further reading

 
 

Tenebrionoidea